Deh Nowmir (also Romanized as Deh Nowmīr and Deh Now-e Mīr) is a village in Bandar Charak Rural District, Shibkaveh District, Bandar Lengeh County, Hormozgan Province, Iran. At the 2006 census, its population was 220, in 40 families.

References 

Populated places in Bandar Lengeh County